Charlotte Emily Caslick  (born 9 March 1995) is an Australian professional representative and Olympic level rugby union player. She represents Australia in rugby sevens and in touch football. She won a gold medal at the 2016 Summer Olympics in Rio de Janeiro.

In 2020, following the postponement of the international sevens circuit due to the COVID-19 pandemic, she moved to rugby league, playing for the Sydney Roosters in the NRL Women's Premiership.

In 2021 with the resumption of International 7's rugby, Caslick returned to duties with the Australian 7's team. In 2022 she was co-captain of the gold medal winning team at the 2022 Commonwealth Games in Birmingham. She was a member of the Australian team that won the 2022 Sevens Rugby World Cup held in Cape Town, South Africa in September 2022.

Background
Caslick was born in Brisbane and grew up in the suburb of Corinda. She attended Brisbane State High School. She is engaged to Rugby Union player Lewis Holland.

Playing career

Rugby career
Caslick plays for The Tribe at a club level and in 2013, after graduating from high school, she debuted for Australia. By December 2015, she had earned 13 caps, scoring 31 tries in that two-year period. Caslick has been described as "the best women's rugby sevens player on the planet." and "a key member of the Australian Women’s Rugby Sevens team that is eyeing gold at [2016's] Rio Olympics."

Caslick is a dual international having represented her country at the Australian Youth Olympic Festival and 2013 Rugby Sevens World Cup as well as playing for Touch Football Australia at both age-grade and open levels. She was named in World Rugby's 2014–15 Team of the Season after another stellar season and one of four players nominated for the 2015 World Sevens Player of the Year. Charlotte was also voted player of the tournament in the Australian Nationals. Representative Honours include Touch Football Australia, Australian Youth Olympic Festival (2013) and Queensland. She was a member of Australia's team at the 2016 Olympics, defeating New Zealand in the final to win the inaugural Olympic gold medal in the sport.

In October 2016, Caslick was named as Australia's women's sevens player of the year.

Caslick was named in the Australia squad for the Rugby sevens at the 2020 Summer Olympics. The team came second in the pool round but then lost to Fiji 14-12 in the quarterfinals.

Rugby league
In 2020, with the suspension of the World Rugby Women's Sevens Series and Tokyo Olympics due to the COVID-19 pandemic, Caslick made the switch to rugby league,  joining the Sydney Roosters in the NRL Women's Premiership. A North Queensland Cowboys fan, she opted to join the Roosters over the Brisbane Broncos, the Cowboys' arch-rivals.

A week later, in the Roosters' 22–12 Round 2 win over the New Zealand Warriors, Caslick suffered two small factures to her spine, ruling her out for the rest of the NRLW season.

Honors and achievements
 2016, World Rugby Women's Sevens Player of the Year
 2019, Kitakyushu Sevens performance tracker player of the round

See also

List of players who have converted from one football code to another

References

External links 
 
 
 

1995 births
Sportswomen from Queensland
Rugby union players from Brisbane
Australian female rugby sevens players
Australia international rugby sevens players
Living people
Rugby sevens players at the 2016 Summer Olympics
Olympic rugby sevens players of Australia
Touch footballers
Olympic gold medalists for Australia
Olympic medalists in rugby sevens
Medalists at the 2016 Summer Olympics
Australian female rugby union players
Commonwealth Games medallists in rugby sevens
Commonwealth Games silver medallists for Australia
Recipients of the Medal of the Order of Australia
People educated at Brisbane State High School
Rugby sevens players at the 2018 Commonwealth Games
Australian female rugby league players
Rugby league five-eighths
Rugby league fullbacks
Sydney Roosters (NRLW) players
Rugby sevens players at the 2020 Summer Olympics
20th-century Australian women
21st-century Australian women
Rugby sevens players at the 2022 Commonwealth Games
Medallists at the 2018 Commonwealth Games
Medallists at the 2022 Commonwealth Games